Catharina Hendrica "Sabrina" van der Sloot (born 16 March 1991) is a Dutch water polo player for CN Sabadell and the Dutch national team.

She participated at the 2009 World Aquatics Championships. After winning the 2018 Women's European Water Polo Championship Sabrina was elected most valuable player of the tournament. She participated at the 2020 Women's European Water Polo Championship.

See also
 List of World Aquatics Championships medalists in water polo

References

External links 
 

1991 births
Living people
Dutch female water polo players
Expatriate water polo players
Dutch expatriates in Hungary
Dutch expatriate sportspeople in Italy
Sportspeople from Gouda, South Holland
Water polo players at the 2020 Summer Olympics
World Aquatics Championships medalists in water polo
21st-century Dutch women
Olympic water polo players of the Netherlands